Ali Al Sharqi (Arabic: علي الشرقي )is a town in  Maysan province, Iraq . It lies 60 km from the city of Amarah

References

Populated places in Maysan Province
District capitals of Iraq
Maysan Governorate